Beardsley may refer to:


Places in the United States
 Beardsley, Arizona, a populated place
 Beardsley, Kansas, a ghost town
 Beardsley, Minnesota, a city
 Beardsley Canal, Kern County, California, an irrigation canal
 Beardsley Creek, New York

People
 Beardsley (surname), a list of people with the surname
 Beardsley Ruml (1894–1960), American statistician, economist, philanthropist, planner and businessman

Other uses
 Beardsley Zoo, a zoological garden in Bridgeport, Connecticut, United States
 Beardsley Electric Company - see List of defunct automobile manufacturers of the United States
 Allenby Beardsley, a Mobile Fighter G Gundam character

See also
 Beardsley meteorite